The Urric was a French automobile manufactured between 1905 and 1906.  Called a "well-conceived" voiturette, it was shown at the Paris Salon of 1905.

References
David Burgess Wise, The New Illustrated Encyclopedia of Automobiles 

Defunct motor vehicle manufacturers of France